RK Žito Prilep (HC Žito Prilep) is a Macedonian women's handball club from Prilep, North Macedonia. The team competes in the Macedonian women's First League of Handball.

History 
The club was founded in 1979. It has played in the Women's EHF Challenge Cup twice, reaching the Quarterfinals in the 2010-11 season. The following season they barely missed Round 3 in the 2011–12 Women's EHF Cup Winners' Cup, losing to HC Veselí nad Moravou on away goals.

Domestic Achievements
Champions
1988

Arena 
Sportska arena SONCE is the home of Žito Prilep. It has a capacity of 1,500 and was built in 1975. In 2011, it was completely renovated by the club which now owns the arena.

Current squad 2011/2012

 Sandra Durlanova (Goalkeeper)
 Mihaela Ialomiteanu (Goalkeeper)
 Dijana Naumoska (Goalkeeper)
 Sofija Adjuleska 
 Sara Caneska
 Jovanka Cvetanovska
 Kristina Ilieska
 Andrea Klikovac
 Marija Kogoj
 Danijela Matanovic
 Slavica Mrkich
 Biljana Pavicevic
 Ivana Petkovska
 Marija Petleska
 Marija Serafimovska
 Marija Steriova
 Ana Stojanovic
 Tamara Stojanovic

References

External links 
Official Website 
EHF Profile 
Fan Club Forum 
Macedonian Handball Federation 
Women's Regional Handball League 

Handball clubs in North Macedonia
Handball clubs established in 2009
Sport in Prilep